Anne Klein or Ann Klein may refer to:

 Ann Klein (1923–1986), American politician
 Anne C. Klein (born 1947), professor of religious studies
 Anne Klein (fashion designer) or Hannah Golofsky (1923–1974), American fashion designer and businesswoman
 Anne Klein (politician) (1950–2011), German lawyer and politician
 Anne Sceia Klein, American businesswoman and communications specialist

See also
 Annie Kline, mining pioneer
 Anna Klein (disambiguation)